Francisco de Vargas y Mexia (b. Madrid, date unknown; d. at the Hieronymite monastery of la Cisla in 1566) was a Spanish diplomat and ecclesiastical writer.

He belonged to an old family of the lower nobility and studied law at the University of Alcalá, receiving the degree of licentiate in law. He became a government official, and by his energy and education, especially by his knowledge of law, rose to the position of fiscal of the Council of Castile (Fiscal del Consejos de Castilla), that is, attorney-general. In 1545, Charles V, Holy Roman Emperor, sent him to the Council of Trent. In January, 1548, he protested, as Charles's representative at the council, against its transfer to Bologna, and in 1551 he congratulated the council on its return to Trent.

During the years 1552-59 he was the Spanish ambassador in Venice.

Writing after King Philip II of Spain had decided to declare war against the pope, he wrote in a letter to the Princess Dowager of Portugal, Regent of Spain, dated 22 September 1556:

In 1558, he negotiated at Rome with Paul IV regarding the recognition of Ferdinand I as emperor, and in references to the founding of new dioceses in the Netherlands. From 1559 he succeeded Gigueroa as the Spanish ambassador to the Roman Curia. As such he took an important part in the election of Pius IV. When Pius IV brought suit against the relatives of Paul IV, Vargas exerted himself to save the Caraffa. For some time he was not regarded favorably by the pope, who tried to have him recalled by Spain; however, Vargas again obtained the confidence of Pius IV, and was commissioned by the latter in 1563 to prepare an opinion on the question of the papal jurisdiction, as to which the Council of Trent had become involved in a dispute.

The document Vargas prepared was published at Rome in the same year under the title of De episcoporum jurisdictione et de pontificis maximi auctoritate responsum. In this Vargas speaks as a strict supporter of the papacy. Another theological question that he took up was that of granting the cup to the laity; to this he was decidedly opposed. His reports and letters contain important information on the doings of the Council of Trent; but he cannot be regarded as an entirely unprejudiced witness, because his interest was that of a diplomat in the service of his king. He was prominent in the affairs of the council for the last time when, in conjunction with the Spanish ambassador at Trent, he tried to postpone the close of the council. After his return to Spain he was made state councillor, but soon resigned all his offices and retired to the Hieronymite monastery of la Cisla near Toledo, in order to prepare himself for death. His contemporaries praised him as a highly educated man and a patron of learning.

References

 cites:
Michel Le Vassor, Lettres et memoires de Francois de Vargas touchant le Concile de Trente (Amsterdam, 1700);

1566 deaths
Spanish diplomats
Participants in the Council of Trent
Year of birth unknown